(Making It Through) is a Japanese television drama series which first aired on TBS in 1990.

Cast
 Takuya Fujioka / Ken Utsui as Daikichi Okakura
 Hisano Yamaoka as Setsukon Okakura
 Aiko Nagayama
 Izumi Pinko
 Yoshiko Nakada
 Kazuki Enari
 Takuzō Kadono
 Takaaki Enoki as Hisamitsu Aoyama
 Masako Izumi (4th series)
 Kunihiko Mitamura
 Masaki Kanda
 Satsohi Tokushige
 Harue Akagi as Miki Kojima

Episodes

References

External links
 

1990 Japanese television series debuts
2011 Japanese television series endings
TBS Television (Japan) dramas
Japanese drama television series